A data protection officer (DPO) ensures, in an independent manner, that an organization applies the laws protecting individuals' personal data. The designation, position and tasks of a DPO within an organization are described in Articles 37, 38 and 39 of the European Union (EU) General Data Protection Regulation (GDPR). Many other countries require the appointment of a DPO, and it is becoming more prevalent in privacy legislation.  

According to the GDPR, the DPO shall directly report to the highest management level. This doesn't mean the DPO has to be directly managed at this level but they must have direct access to give advice to senior managers who are making decisions about personal data processing.

The core responsibilities of the DPO include ensuring his/her organization is aware of, and trained on, all relevant GDPR obligations. Additionally, they must conduct audits to ensure compliance, address potential issues proactively, and act as a liaison between his/her organization and the public regarding all data privacy matters.

In Germany, a 2001 law established a requirement for a DPO in certain organizations and included various protections around the scope and tenure for the role, including protections against dismissal for bringing problems to the attention of management. Many of these concepts were incorporated into the drafting of Article 38 of the GDPR and have continued to be incorporated in other privacy standards.

References

External links 
 Section 4 - Data protection officer (DPO)

Data protection
Data protection authorities